The Money Devil (German: Der Geldteufel) is a 1923 German silent drama film directed by Heinz Goldberg and starring Stella Arbenina, Karl Forest and Otto Gebühr.

Cast
In alphabetical order
 Stella Arbenina as Die Schwarze 
 Karl Forest as Der Alte 
 Otto Gebühr as Leonid Fenton 
 John Gottowt as Black 
 Suzanne Marwille as Marquise 
 Luigi Serventi as Marquis Redonc 
 Alexandra Sorina as Cyproenne Marlén 
 Ferdinand von Alten as Chartelier

References

Bibliography
 Bock, Hans-Michael & Bergfelder, Tim. The Concise CineGraph. Encyclopedia of German Cinema. Berghahn Books, 2009.

External links

1923 films
Films of the Weimar Republic
Films directed by Heinz Goldberg
German silent feature films
German black-and-white films
1923 drama films
German drama films
Silent drama films
1920s German films